Viktoriya Yuryevna Klyugina (née Slivka; 28 September 1980) is a Russian high jumper.

Career 
She finished fifth at the 1998 World Junior Championships, sixth at the 2000 European Indoor Championships, won the bronze medal at the 2009 European Indoor Championships and finished eighth at the 2009 World Athletics Final.

Her personal best jump is 1.98 metres, achieved in July 2008 in Bühl. She has 2.00 metres on the indoor track, achieved in February 2009 in Arnstadt (Hochsprung mit Musik).

She is married to Sergey Klyugin.

References 

1980 births
Living people
Russian female high jumpers